Dagdizel Plant is a company based in Kaspiysk, Dagestan and established in 1932. It is part of Gidropribor (Tactical Missiles Corporation).

The Dagdizel Plant has long produced naval torpedoes, and also produces diesel generators, shipboard instruments and systems.

Products
 VA-111 Shkval
 Futlyar

References

External links
 Official website

Manufacturing companies of Russia
Companies based in Dagestan
Tactical Missiles Corporation
Ministry of the Shipbuilding Industry (Soviet Union)
Defence companies of the Soviet Union
1932 establishments in the Soviet Union